General Ray may refer to:

Arjun Ray (born 1944), Indian Army lieutenant general
Patrick Henry Ray (1842–1911), U.S. Army brigadier general
Timothy Ray (fl. 1980s–2020s), U.S. Air Force general

See also
Alain Le Ray (1910–2007), French Army general
General Rey (disambiguation)